Salih Koç (18 June 1917 – 17 May 2000) was a Turkish equestrian. He competed at the 1948 Summer Olympics, the 1956 Summer Olympics and the 1960 Summer Olympics.

References

External links
 

1917 births
2000 deaths
Turkish male equestrians
Olympic equestrians of Turkey
Equestrians at the 1948 Summer Olympics
Equestrians at the 1956 Summer Olympics
Equestrians at the 1960 Summer Olympics
Sportspeople from Ankara